04092001 is a collaborative live album between Japanese experimental metal band Boris and noise musician Merzbow. Although no track listing is provided on the cover, the recording clearly consists of five songs from Heavy Rocks.

Track listing

Personnel
Boris with Merzbow
Masami Akita – computer
Takeshi – vocal, bass
Wata – guitar
Atsuo – vocal, drums
Production
Souichiro Nakamura – mastering at Peace Music, 08052003
Enju Tanahashi – executive producer
Fangsanalsatan – design

Release history

References

Collaborative albums
Boris (band) live albums
Merzbow live albums
2005 live albums
Inoxia Records live albums